Cliff Nielsen is an American book illustrator and comic book artist. The Internet Speculative Fiction Database credits him with cover art for about 500 book and magazine covers published since 1994 Nielsen is best known for his work on projects such as Star Wars, The X-Files, Chronicles of Narnia among many projects including advertising campaigns, designs, and magazines. His illustrations have been recognized for their excellence by the Society of Illustrators, Print, and Spectrum among others. Feature articles focusing on his work appear in design publications and fanzine magazines. Nielsen has been an international speaker on digital art and has served as a judge for the Society of Illustrators and a variety of professional illustration award programs. He lives in Los Angeles, California. 

In 1995, the husband-and-wife team of Cliff and Terese Nielsen (since divorced) collaborated on Ruins, a Marvel Comics mini-series (two issues).

Work
Nielsen's works are primarily created digitally. He has illustrated the covers of several books, including:
 The Giver
 The Chronicles of Narnia 
 Star Wars 
 Star Trek 
 Wrinkle in Time 
 The Dark Tower series
 The Mortal Instruments
 The Infernal Devices
 Shadowhunter Academy
 Cirque Du Freak
 Heir Apparent
 Ranger's Apprentice
 The Inheritance Trilogy
 Tiger's Curse series
 Blood and Chocolate
 Demon in My View
 Midnight Predator
 Royal Street 
 Kiesha'ra Series
 The Chronicles of Faerie
 Buffy the Vampire Faerie
 Jane Yellowrock Series
 Touching Spirit Bear 
 The Last Hours

He has also illustrated some comic books, such as Marvel comic book Ruins.

Besides this, he was known for working in the magazine Carpe Noctem, and was interviewed as well as created a few covers. He is currently designing/writing a graphic novel known as Beloved, but it so far, has only shown at ComicCon.  Nielsen has also illustrated cards for the Magic: The Gathering collectible card game.

Bibliography
 The Other Wind (2001) (Written and Illustrated by Ursula K. Le Guin)

References

External links
 Cliff Nielsen at agent Shannon Associates
 

 

American illustrators
American speculative fiction artists
Artists from Los Angeles
Fantasy artists
Game artists
Living people
Place of birth missing (living people)
Year of birth missing (living people)
Artists represented by Shannon Associates